Grapeland Independent School District is a public school district based in Grapeland, Texas (USA).

In 2009, the school district was rated "academically acceptable" by the Texas Education Agency.

Schools
Grapeland High School (Grades 9-12)
Grapeland Junior High (Grades 7-8)
Grapeland Elementary (Grades PK-6)

References

External links
Grapeland ISD

School districts in Houston County, Texas